The Katangese franc, was the currency of the unrecognized State of Katanga between 1960 and 1963 during its brief period of independence from the Republic of the Congo. It replaced the Congolese franc at par and was consequently initially equal to the Belgian franc. This established an exchange rate of 50 francs = 1 U.S. dollar. Just before Katanga was re-annexed by Congo, the exchange rate had fallen to 195 francs = 1 U.S. dollar. The currency was replaced at par by the Congolese franc.

Coins
Bronze coins were issued in 1961 in denominations of 1 and 5 francs. A non-circulating gold 5 francs coin was also issued for collectors. Only one set containing 1 francs and 5 francs were ever made, and they remain readily available to collectors at nominal cost.  Their design shows a copper cross, which was locally used for money in precolonial times.

Banknotes
In 1961, a provisional issue of notes was produced by the government. These were overprinted on notes of the Ruanda-Urundi franc in denominations of 5, 10, 20, and 50 francs. On 9 January 1961, regular notes dated 31.10.60 were issued by the Banque Nationale du Katanga in denominations of 10, 20, 50, 100, 500 and 1000 francs. A second series of notes was also issued dated 1962 and 1963 in denominations of 100, 500, and 1000 francs.

References

Further reading

Modern obsolete currencies
Currencies of Africa
1960 establishments in the Republic of the Congo (Léopoldville)
1963 disestablishments
1960s economic history
Currencies of the Democratic Republic of the Congo
State of Katanga